Gândara is a neighbourhood of the Portuguese city of Póvoa de Varzim.

History
Gândara was between the 16th century and the 18th century, the main reason for disputes between Póvoa de Varzim town hall and Barcelos of the House of Braganza, as it already had a considerable population. Póvoa de Varzim claimed that its municipality corresponded to the medieval Villa Euracini or the old parish of Argivai. On the other hand, Barcelos justified that it had most status in the region; and under the domain of the House of Bragança it kept the Gândara in its domains, leaving the town of Póvoa de Varzim divided in half, controlling only the royal land given by King Denis (the southwest of the current parish of Póvoa de Varzim in its domains).

In 1707, following a royal determination, Corregedor Gaspar Cardoso demarcates the municipality of Póvoa de Varzim, including most of Gândara, considering groundless the demarcations of the House of Bragança. In the 19th century, the territory of Póvoa de Varzim was considerably enlarged, ending the rivalries with neighbouring Barcelos.

In 1833, the Bairro de Argivai (Quarter of Argivai) of the town, a civil entity distinct from the ecclesiastical parish, extended in 1833 to Bom Sucesso Chapel.

Neighbourhoods of Póvoa de Varzim